Alan Ashton may refer to:

 Alan Ashton (politician) (born 1952), former Australian politician
 Alan C. Ashton (born 1942), founder of WordPerfect
Alan Ashton (rugby league) from List of St Helens RLFC past players